Guardians of Being is a picture book written by Eckhart Tolle, and illustrated by Patrick McDonnell.

Content 
Eckhart's official website describes the book as conveying "a profound love of nature, of animals, of humans, of all life-forms [and] celebrates and reminds us of ... the wonder and joy to be found in the present moment, amid the beauty we sometimes forget to notice all around us".

The book was illustrated by Patrick McDonnell, the artist for the comic strip Mutts.

Reception 
Ken MacQueen at Macleans.ca described it as his "thinnest, but perhaps most accessible work, [distilling] Tolle’s teachings into fewer than 1,000 words."  Nick DiMartino at Shelf-Awareness.com said "forgive the book its pretentious, silly name. Otherwise, it's... a gem of a book about the role animals have in our spiritual and mental lives."

References

External links 
Guardians of Being on Eckhart Tolle's official page
Interview with Patrick McDonnell in which he discusses Guardians of Being

New Age books
Books about spirituality
American picture books
Self-help books
2009 non-fiction books
New Thought literature